Sosnovka is a rural locality (a selo) and the administrative center of Sosnovskoye Rural Settlement, Rudnyansky District, Volgograd Oblast, Russia. The population was 582 as of 2010. There are 6 streets.

Geography 
Sosnovka is located in steppe, on the right bank of the Tersa River, 32 km west of Rudnya (the district's administrative centre) by road. Matyshevo is the nearest rural locality.

References 

Rural localities in Rudnyansky District, Volgograd Oblast